Nikolay Aleksandrovich Skvortsov was a Soviet politician and the First Secretary of the Communist Party of the Kazakh SSR from May 3, 1938 to September 14, 1945.

1899 births
1974 deaths
People from Astrakhan Governorate
Central Committee of the Communist Party of the Soviet Union members
People's commissars and ministers of the Soviet Union
First Secretaries of the Communist Party of Kazakhstan
Recipients of the Order of Lenin
First convocation members of the Supreme Soviet of the Soviet Union
Second convocation members of the Supreme Soviet of the Soviet Union
Fourth convocation members of the Supreme Soviet of the Soviet Union